Kengen, originally called Kenrene (pronounced kɛnrɛne), is a town in Jomoro District of the Jomoro constituency of the Western Region of Ghana. Other people have ascribed names such as Kangan or Kangane, but this is as a result of mispronunciation by non-local writers.

Populated places in Jomoro Municipal District